Permila borealis is an extinct insect.

Prehistoric insects
Permian insects
Fossils of Russia
Protodiptera